Cardiopulmonary bypass (CPB) is a technique in which a machine temporarily takes over the function of the heart and lungs during surgery, maintaining the circulation of blood and oxygen to the body. The CPB pump itself is often referred to as a heart–lung machine or "the pump". Cardiopulmonary bypass pumps are operated by perfusionists.  CPB is a form of extracorporeal circulation. Extracorporeal membrane oxygenation is generally used for longer-term treatment.

CPB mechanically circulates and oxygenates blood for the body while bypassing the heart and lungs. It uses a heart–lung machine to maintain perfusion to other body organs and tissues while the surgeon works in a bloodless surgical field. The surgeon places a cannula in the right atrium, vena cava, or femoral vein to withdraw blood from the body. Venous blood is removed from the body by the cannula and then filtered, cooled or warmed, and oxygenated before it is returned to the body by a mechanical pump. The cannula used to return oxygenated blood is usually inserted in the ascending aorta, but it may be inserted in the femoral artery, axillary artery, or brachiocephalic artery (among others).

The patient  is administered heparin to prevent clotting, and protamine sulfate is given after to reverse effects of heparin. During the procedure, hypothermia may be maintained; body temperature is usually kept at 28 °C to 32 °C (82.4–89.6 °F). The blood is cooled during CPB and returned to the body. The cooled blood slows the body's basal metabolic rate, decreasing its demand for oxygen. Cooled blood usually has a higher viscosity, but the crystalloid solution used to prime the bypass tubing dilutes the blood.

Uses

Cardiopulmonary bypass is commonly used in operations involving the heart. The technique allows the surgical team to oxygenate and circulate the patient's blood, thus allowing the surgeon to operate on the heart. In many operations, such as coronary artery bypass grafting (CABG), the heart is arrested (i.e., stopped) because of the difficulty of operating on the beating heart. Operations requiring the opening of the chambers of the heart, for example, mitral valve repair or replacement, requires the use of CPB to avoid engulfing air systemically and to provide a bloodless field to increase visibility for the surgeon. The machine pumps the blood and, using an oxygenator, allows red blood cells to pick up oxygen, as well as allowing carbon dioxide levels to decrease. This mimics the function of the heart and the lungs, respectively.

CPB can be used for the induction of total body hypothermia, a state in which the body can be maintained for up to 45 minutes without perfusion (blood flow). If blood flow is stopped at normal body temperature, permanent brain damage normally occurs in three to four minutes – death may follow shortly afterward. Similarly, CPB can be used to rewarm individuals who have hypothermia. This rewarming method of using CPB is successful if the core temperature of the patient is above 16 °C.

Extracorporeal membrane oxygenation (ECMO) is a simplified version of the heart lung machine that includes a centrifugal pump and an oxygenator to temporarily take over the function of heart and/or the lungs. ECMO is useful in post cardiac surgery patients with cardiac or pulmonary dysfunction, in patients with acute pulmonary failure, massive pulmonary embolisms, lung trauma from infections, and a range of other problems that impair cardiac or pulmonary function. ECMO gives the heart and/or lungs time to repair or recover but is only a temporary solution. Patients with terminal conditions, cancer, severe nervous system damage, uncontrolled sepsis and other conditions may not be candidates for ECMO.

Surgical procedures in which cardiopulmonary bypass is used

Coronary artery bypass surgery
Cardiac valve repair and/or replacement (aortic valve, mitral valve, tricuspid valve, pulmonic valve)
Repair of large septal defects (atrial septal defect, ventricular septal defect, atrioventricular septal defect)
Repair and/or palliation of congenital heart defects (Tetralogy of Fallot, transposition of the great vessels)
Transplantation (heart transplantation, lung transplantation, heart–lung transplantation, liver transplantation)
Repair of some large aneurysms (aortic aneurysms, cerebral aneurysms)
Pulmonary thromboendarterectomy
Pulmonary thrombectomy
Isolated Limb perfusion

Contraindications and special considerations 
There are no absolute contraindications to cardiopulmonary bypass. However, there are several factors that need to be considered by the care team when planning an operation.

Heparin-induced thrombocytopenia (HIT) and heparin-induced thrombocytopenia and thrombosis (HITT) are potentially life-threatening conditions associated with the administration of heparin. In HIT or HITT, antibodies against heparin are formed which causes platelet activation and the formation of blood clots. Because heparin is typically used in CPB, patients who are known to have the antibodies responsible for HIT and HITT require alternative forms of anticoagulation. Bivalirudin is the most studied heparin-alternative in patients with HIT or HITT requiring CPB.

A small percentage of patients, such as those with an antithrombin III deficiency, may exhibit resistance to heparin. In these patients, patients may need additional heparin, fresh frozen plasma, or other blood products such as recombinant anti-thrombin III to achieve adequate anticoagulation.

A persistent left superior vena cava (PLSVC) is thoracic system variation in which the left-sided vena cava fails to involute during normal development. It is the most common variation of the thoracic venous system, occurring in approximately 0.3% of the population. The abnormality is often detected on pre-operative imaging studies, but may also be discovered intra-operatively. A PLSVC may make it difficult to achieve proper venous drainage or deliver of retrograde cardioplegia. Management of a PLSVC during CPB depends on factors such as the size and drainage site of the PSLVC.

Risks and complications

CPB is not benign and there are a number of associated problems. As a consequence, CPB is only used during the several hours a cardiac surgery may take. CPB is known to activate the coagulation cascade and stimulate inflammatory mediators, leading to hemolysis and coagulopathies. This problem worsens as complement proteins build on the membrane oxygenators. For this reason, most oxygenators come with a manufacturer's recommendation that they are only used for a maximum of six hours, although they are sometimes used for up to ten hours, with care being taken to ensure they do not clot off and stop working. For longer periods than this, an ECMO (extracorporeal membrane oxygenation) is used, which can be in operation for up to 31 days – such as in a Taiwanese case, for 16 days, after which the patient received a heart transplant.

The most common complication associated with CPB is a protamine reaction during anticoagulation reversal. There are three types of protamine reactions, and each may cause life-threatening hypotension (type I), anaphylaxis (type II), or pulmonary hypertension (type III).  Patients with prior exposure to protamine, such as those who have had a previous vasectomy (protamine is contained in sperm) or diabetics (protamine is contained in neutral protamine hagedorn (NPH) insulin formulations), are at an increased risk of type II protamine reactions due to cross-sensitivity. Because protamine is a fast-acting drug, it is typically given slowly to allow for monitoring of possible reactions. The first step in management of a protamine reaction is to immediately stop the protamine infusion. Corticosteroids are used for all types of protamine reactions. Chlorphenamine is used for type II (anaphylactic) reactions. For type III reactions, heparin is redosed and the patient may need to go back on bypass.

CPB may contribute to immediate cognitive decline. The heart-lung blood circulation system and the connection surgery itself release a variety of debris into the bloodstream, including bits of blood cells, tubing, and plaque. For example, when surgeons clamp and connect the aorta to tubing, resulting emboli may block blood flow and cause mini strokes. Other heart surgery factors related to mental damage may be events of hypoxia, high or low body temperature, abnormal blood pressure, irregular heart rhythms, and fever after surgery.

Components
Cardiopulmonary bypass consists of two main functional units, the pump and the oxygenator which removes relatively oxygen-depleted blood from a patient's body and replaces it with oxygen-rich blood through a series of tubes (hoses). A heat exchanger is used to control body temperature by heating or cooling the blood in the circuit. It is important that all components of the circuit are coated internally by heparin or another anticoagulant to prevent clotting within the circuit.

Tubing
The components of the CPB circuit are interconnected by a series of tubes made of silicone rubber or PVC.

Pumps

Centrifugal pump
Many CPB circuits now employ a centrifugal pump for the maintenance and control of blood flow during CPB. By altering the speed of revolution (RPM) of the pump head, blood flow is produced by centrifugal force. This type of pumping action is considered to be superior to the action of the roller pump by many because it is thought to prevent overpressurization, clamping or kinking of lines, and produce less damage to blood products (hemolysis, etc.).

Roller pump
The pump console usually comprises several rotating motor-driven pumps that peristaltically "massage" tubing.  This action gently propels the blood through the tubing. This is commonly referred to as a roller pump, or peristaltic pump. The pumps are more affordable than their centrifugal counterparts, but are susceptible to overpressurization if the lines become clamped or kinked. They are also more likely to cause a massive air embolism and require constant, close supervision by the perfusionist.

Oxygenator
The oxygenator is designed to add oxygen to infused blood and remove some of the carbon dioxide from the venous blood.  Cardiac surgery was made possible by CPB using bubble oxygenators, but membrane oxygenators have supplanted bubble oxygenators since the 1980s. The main reasons for this are that membrane oxygenators tend to generate many fewer micro-bubbles, referred to as gaseous microemboli, which is generally considered harmful to the patient and reduce damage to blood cells, compared to bubble oxygenators. More recently, the use of hollow-fiber oxygenators has become more widespread. These derivatives of membrane oxygenators further reduce the occurrence of microemboli by reducing the direct air-blood interface while simultaneously providing adequate gas exchange.

Another type of oxygenator gaining favour recently is the heparin-coated blood oxygenator which is believed to produce less systemic inflammation and decrease the propensity for blood to clot in the CPB circuit.

Heat exchangers 
Because hypothermia is frequently used in CPB to reduce metabolic demands (including that of the heart), heat exchangers are implemented to warm and cool blood within the circuit. The heating and cooling is accomplished by passing the line through a warm or ice water bath. A separate heat exchanger is required for the cardioplegia line.

Cannulae
Multiple cannulae are sewn into the patient's body in a variety of locations, depending on the type of surgery. A venous cannula removes oxygen depleted venous blood from a patient's body. An arterial cannula infuses oxygen-rich blood into the arterial system. The main determinants of cannula size selection is determined by the patient's size and weight, anticipated flow rate, and the size of the vessel being cannulated. A cardioplegia cannula delivers a cardioplegia solution to cause the heart to stop beating.

Some commonly used cannulation sites:

Cardioplegia

Cardioplegia is a fluid solution used to protect the heart during CPB. It is delivered via a cannula to the opening of the coronary arteries (usually by way of the aortic root) and/or to the cardiac veins (by way of the coronary sinus). These delivery methods are referred to antegrade and retrograde, respectively. Cardioplegia solution protects the heart by arresting (i.e. stopping) the heart, thereby decreasing its metabolic demand. There are multiple types of cardioplegia solutions, but most work by inhibiting fast sodium currents in the heart, thereby preventing conduction of the action potential. Other types of solutions act by inhibiting calcium's actions on myocytes.

Technique

Pre-operative planning
CPB requires significant forethought before surgery. In particular, the cannulation, cooling, and cardio-protective strategies must be coordinated between the surgeon, anesthesiologist, perfusionist, and nursing staff.

Cannulation strategy 
The cannulation strategy varies on several operation-specific and patient-specific details. The typical arterial cannulation involves the placement of a single cannulation within distal ascending aorta. The most simple form on involves placement of a single cannula (known as a dual-stage cannula) passed through the right atrium and into the inferior vena cava. In some operations, such as those involving the tricuspid or mitral valve, two cannula are used—one is passed through the inferior vena cava and one through the superior vena cava. This is known as bi-caval cannulation.

Intra-operative technique 
A CPB circuit must be primed with fluid and all air expunged from the arterial line/cannula before connection to the patient. The circuit is primed with a crystalloid solution and sometimes blood products are also added. Prior to cannulation (typically after opening the pericardium when using central cannulation), heparin or another anticoagulant is administered until the activated clotting time is above 480 seconds.

The arterial cannulation site is inspected for calcification or other disease. Preoperative imaging or an ultrasound probe may be used to help identify aortic calcifications that could potentially become dislodged and cause an occlusion or stroke. Once the cannulation site has been deemed safe, two concentric, diamond-shaped pursestring sutures are placed in the distal ascending aorta. A stab incision with a scalpel is made within the pursestrings and the arterial cannula is passed through the incision. It is important the cannula is passed perpendicular to the aorta to avoid creating an aortic dissection. The pursestrings sutures are cinched around the cannula using a tourniquet and secured to the cannula. At this point, the perfusionist advances the arterial line of the CPB circuit and the surgeon connects the arterial line coming from the patient to the arterial line coming from the CPB machine. Care must be taken to ensure no air is in the circuit when the two are connected, or else the patient could develop an air embolism. Other sites for arterial cannulation include the axillary artery, brachiocephalic artery, or femoral artery.

Aside from the differences in location, venous cannulation is performed similarly to arterial cannulation. Since calcification of the venous system is less common, the inspection or use of an ultrasound for calcification at the cannulation sites is unnecessary. Also, because the venous system is under much less pressure than the arterial system, only a single suture is required to hold the cannula in place. If only a single cannula is to be used (dual-stage cannulation), it is passed through the right atrial appendage, through the tricuspid valve, and into the inferior vena cava. If two cannula are required (single-stage cannulation), the first one is typically passed through the superior vena cava and the second through the inferior vena cava. The femoral vein may also be cannulated in select patients.

If the heart must be stopped for the operation, cardioplegia cannulas are also required. Antegrade cardioplegia (forward flowing, through the heart's arteries), retrograde cardioplegia (backwards flowing, through the heart's veins), or both types may be used depending on the operation and surgeon preference. For antegrade cardioplegia, a small incision is made in the aorta proximal to the arterial cannulation site (between the heart and arterial cannulation site) and the cannula is placed through this to deliver cardioplegia to the coronary arteries. For retrograde cardioplegia, an incision is made on the posterior (back) surface of the heart through the right ventricle. The cannula is placed in this incision, passed through the tricuspid valve, and into the coronary sinus. The cardioplegia lines are connected to the CPB machine.

At this point, the patient is ready to go on bypass. Blood from the venous cannula(s) enters the CPB machine by gravity where it is oxygenated and cooled (if necessary) before returning to the body through the arterial cannula. Cardioplegia can now be administered to stop the heart, and a cross-clamp is placed across the aorta between the arterial cannula and cardioplegia cannula to prevent the arterial blood from flowing backwards into the heart.

Once the patient is ready to come off of bypass support, the cross-clamp and cannulas are removed and protamine sulfate is administered to reverse the anticoagulative effects of heparin.

History

The Austrian-German physiologist Maximilian von Frey constructed an early prototype of a heart-lung machine in 1885 at Carl Ludwig's Physiological Institute of the University of Leipzig.
However, such machines were not feasible before the discovery of heparin in 1916, which prevents blood coagulation. The Soviet scientist Sergei Brukhonenko developed a heart-lung machine for total body perfusion in 1926 named the Autojektor, which was used in experiments with canines, some of which were showcased in the 1940 film Experiments in the Revival of Organisms. A team of scientists at the University of Birmingham (including Eric Charles, a chemical engineer) were among the pioneers of this technology.

Dr. Clarence Dennis led the team at the University of Minnesota Medical Center that on April 5, 1951, conducted the first human operation involving open cardiotomy with temporary mechanical takeover of both heart and lung functions. The patient did not survive due to an unexpected complex congenital heart defect. One member of the team was Dr. Russell M. Nelson, who later became president of the Church of Jesus Christ of Latter-day Saints and who performed the first open heart surgery in Utah.

The first successful mechanical support of left ventricular function was performed on July 3, 1952, by Forest Dewey Dodrill using a machine co-developed with General Motors, the Dodrill-GMR. The machine was later used to support right ventricular function.

The first successful open heart procedure on a human utilizing the heart lung machine was performed by John Gibbon and Frank F. Allbritten, Jr. on May 6, 1953, at Thomas Jefferson University Hospital in Philadelphia. They repaired an atrial septal defect in an 18-year-old woman. Gibbon's machine was further developed into a reliable instrument by a surgical team led by John W. Kirklin at the Mayo Clinic in Rochester, Minnesota in the mid-1950s.

The oxygenator was first conceptualized in the 17th century by Robert Hooke and developed into practical extracorporeal oxygenators by French and German experimental physiologists in the 19th century. Bubble oxygenators have no intervening barrier between blood and oxygen, these are called 'direct contact' oxygenators. Membrane oxygenators introduce a gas-permeable membrane between blood and oxygen that decreases the blood trauma of direct-contact oxygenators. Much work since the 1960s focused on overcoming the gas exchange handicap of the membrane barrier, leading to the development of high-performance microporous hollow-fibre oxygenators that eventually replaced direct-contact oxygenators in cardiac theatres.

In 1983, Ken Litzie patented a closed emergency heart bypass system which reduced circuit and component complexity. This device improved patient survival after cardiac arrest because it could be rapidly deployed in non-surgical settings.

References

Further reading

External links 

International Consortium For Evidence-Based Perfusion
CircuitSurfers: A Perfusion Blog about Cardiopulmonary Bypass
Multimedia Manual of Cardiothoracic Surgery.  Cardiopulmonary bypass collection.
  credited with the first attempt at cardiopulmonary bypass surgery.

Medical equipment
American inventions
German inventions
Soviet inventions